Džej Ramadanovski (29 May 1964 – 6 December 2020) was a Serbian singer of folk, turbo-folk and pop-folk music.  

He started his career in 1987 and released a series of albums during 1990s, but retired from recording due to ill health in the early 2000s. In the period from 1988 to 2003, he released 13 albums, with a handful of singles after that. He continued to perform and had previously toured internationally. He died on 6 December 2020 in Belgrade, at the age of 56, due to cardiac arrest.

Life and career

Džej Ramadanovski was born on 29 May 1964 into a Muslim Roma working-class family. His father Mazlam was a shoemaker and mother Barija. His paternal grandfather moved to Belgrade after World War II. The Ramadanovski family were originally from the town of Resen in today's North Macedonia. As a young boy, his parents divorced and his father moved to Austria. Due to truancy from school, he was removed from his mother care and stayed with his grandmother, and was occasionally placed in care. He grew up around the Dorćol neighbourhood of the capital Belgrade. After service in the army, Ramadanovski held odd jobs and began singing in clubs. 

After being discovered by lyricist Marina Tucaković, he rose to prominence by coming second on the 1987 International Music Fair (MESAM) with "Zar ja da ti brišem suze". With songs such as "Nedelja" (1991), "Sunce ljubavi" (1995) and "Upalite za mnom sveće" (1996). Džej finished as the runner-up at the Grand Music Festival in 2008 with "Imati pa nemati" and was also nominated for the Male Folk Singer of the Year award at the 2011 Serbian Popularity Oscar. He continued to record and released approximately an album every year during the 1990s and early 200s. He worked with a number of lyricists and arrangers, including the Futa band, led by Aleksandar Radulović.

Additionally, Džej made cameo appearances in movies Hajde da se volimo 2 (1989) and Vikend sa ćaletom (2020).

In an interview with Politika, Ramadanovski stated that he was related to mobster Iso Lero "Džamba", who wrote several of his songs. With his former wife Nada, he had two daughters Ana and Marija.

Illness and death

In July 2017 Ramadanovski had his first heart surgery on one Private Clinic in the Austrian capital city Vienna.

In the beginning of 2020, a blood clot was found on his heart valve during an examination. On 6 December 2020, Ramadanovski died from a heart attack, he was buried 5 days later.

Discography
Studio albums
Zar ja da ti brišem suze (1988)
Ljubio sam, nisam znao (1988)
Jedan, dva (1989)
Ko se s nama druži (1991)
Blago onom ko rano poludi (1992)
Rađaj sinove (1993)
Sa moje tačke gledišta (1995)
Upalite za mnom sveće (1996)
Na ivici pakla (1997)
Oprosti majko (1998)
Zato (1999)
Ludo vino (2001)
Vozi, vozi... (2003)

Compilation albums
The Best Of Džej 1987 - 1994 Vol. 1 & Vol 2. (1994)
Balade (1997)

References

External links

1964 births
2020 deaths
People from Resen, North Macedonia
Singers from Belgrade
Serbian folk singers
Serbian folk-pop singers
20th-century Serbian male singers
Macedonian Romani people
Serbian Romani people
Romani singers